The Nosivolo River is a river in eastern Madagascar and a primary tributary of the Mangoro River.  It begins east of Fandriana.  The village of Marolambo, capital of the Marolambo District in the Atsinanana region, is located along the river at the junction with the Sandranamby River.

It is an important river in Madagascar due to its biodiversity (including the cichlids Katria katria and Oxylapia polli, and Malagasy rainbowfish), which has spurred efforts to protect it.  It was designed the first river Ramsar site in the country in 2010.

The primary tributaries of the Nosivolo are the Sandranamby River (which joins near Marolambo), Sahadinta, Manandriana, and Sahanao.

References

Rivers of Madagascar
Ramsar sites in Madagascar
Rivers of Atsinanana